Experimental Hematology is a peer-reviewed medical journal of hematology, which publishes original research articles and reviews, as well as the abstracts of the annual proceedings of the Society for Hematology and Stem Cells (formerly known as the International Society for Experimental Hematology). The journal is published monthly by Elsevier, and the annual proceedings are published in a supplement issue. The journal is edited by Connie J. Eaves.

Abstracting and indexing
The journal is abstracted and indexed in:

References

External links
Experimental Hematology website
Society for Hematology and Stem Cells website

Publications established in 1972
English-language journals
Hematology journals
Elsevier academic journals
Monthly journals